Susan E. Eaton (born in 1964) is an American author, journalist, educator, scholar and philanthropic adviser. She is Professor of Practice and Director of the Sillerman Center for the Advancement of Philanthropy at the Heller School for Social Policy at Brandeis University.

Career
She is an adjunct lecturer at the  Harvard University Graduate School of Education. Eaton's work has centered around civil rights in education, school desegregation, racial and ethnic diversity and inclusion in K-12 schools and immigration-related practice and policy at the state and local levels.

She is the author of the books Integration Nation: Immigrants, Refugees and America at its Best, The Children in Room E4: American Education on Trial; The Other Boston Busing Story; and with Gary Orfield, co-author of Dismantling Desegregation: The Quiet Reversal of Brown v. Board of Education.

Eaton founded and co-directed the storytelling project One Nation Indivisible, ("Our Staff") from which the book Integration Nation grew. Her writing has also appeared in The Nation, The New York Times and other publications.

From 2006 to 2015, Eaton was the research director at the Charles Hamilton Houston Institute for Race and Justice at Harvard Law School.

Integration Nation is the WSU Common Reading for the 2016-17 academic year.

Books

Dismantling Desegregation: The Quiet Reversal of Brown V. Board of Education. New York: New Press, 1996 
The Other Boston Busing Story: What's Won and Lost Across the Boundary Line. New Haven: Yale University Press, 2001. 
The Children in Room E4: American Education on Trial. Chapel Hill, N.C: Algonquin Books of Chapel Hill, 2007. 
Integration Nation: Immigrants, Refugees, and America at Its Best. The New Press, 2016, p. 192. .

References

External links
 How a ‘New Secessionist’ Movement Is Threatening to Worsen School Segregation and Widen Inequalities. The Nation
 Integration's Last Leg? The New York Times
Sillerman Center for the Advancement of Philanthropy
 "Our Staff" One Nation Indivisible. Susan E. Eaton
 Brandeis University Faculty Guide. Dr. Susan E. Eaton
 Faculty and Research, Harvard Graduate School of Education. Susan E. Eaton

Educators from Massachusetts
American women educators
Living people
1964 births
American women writers
Brandeis University faculty
Harvard Graduate School of Education faculty
University of Massachusetts Amherst alumni
Harvard Graduate School of Education alumni